The Thibodaux Senators were a minor-league baseball team based in Thibodaux, Louisiana. The team played from 1956-1957 in the Evangeline League.

References

Evangeline Baseball League teams
Senators
Professional baseball teams in Louisiana
Baseball teams established in 1956
1956 establishments in Louisiana
1957 disestablishments in Louisiana
Defunct baseball teams in Louisiana
Washington Senators minor league affiliates
Baseball teams disestablished in 1957